Silent Scope 2, subtitled Fatal Judgement in North America, Innocent Sweeper in Japan, and Dark Silhouette in Europe, is a rail shooter game that is the sequel to the arcade game Silent Scope.

Plot
The player first battles a few enemies along Tower Bridge, London, most of them found on distant buildings, in boats, or on the bridge itself. Afterwards, the player meets his counterpart, either Jackal or Falcon (whichever the player did not choose). According to the player's unseen commander, a bioweapons research facility on the continent has been taken over by the terrorists and its staff held hostage, including Laura, one of the scientists whom Falcon had recently been dating (and whom he finds out is also the sister of his counterpart).

The player is then sent to the research facility, and kills several snow based enemies. The player then battles the first boss, Tanya, who uses a burner to scorch the player. Afterwards, the player is sent outside the snow base, battles more enemies, then battles another boss, Fox.

After completing the snow missions, the player is sent to recover a stolen airplane, and afterwards, faces another boss, Cobra, who seemed to have survived the previous encounter in Silent Scope and claims to be immortal. The player is then sent to a ruins-like location with a river near it. The boss, The Collector, is more challenging than the previous ones, as he has full body armor and has a tank as well as several fire arms as weapons.

The player then goes to an opera house and battles another boss, the Star. The boss tries to launch the missile, leaving the device tied to the hostages, but Falcon and Jackal carefully cancel the launch by shooting devices. Finally, the player is sent to the enemy's base and battles a pair of ninja-like bosses, Sho and Kane, before facing the big boss, who is on a top of a clock tower with Laura as his prisoner. However, the boss suddenly falls down, but his handcuffs are still attached to the prisoner, the player must shoot the handcuffs. The big boss then falls to his death, and the game ends.

Reception

The PlayStation 2 version received "mixed" reviews according to the review aggregation website Metacritic. Jeff Lundrigan of NextGen called it "a waste of anyone's time and money". In Japan, however, Famitsu gave it a score of 29 out of 40.

Also in Japan, Game Machine listed the arcade version on their August 15, 2000 issue as being the fourteenth most-successful dedicated arcade game of the month.

References

Notes

Footnotes

External links
 
 Silent Scope 2: Dark Silhoutte at the Killer List of Videogames

2000 video games
Arcade video games
Cooperative video games
Konami games
Light gun games
Multiplayer and single-player video games
PlayStation 2 games
Rail shooters
Sniper video games
Video game sequels
Video games about terrorism
Video games set in Europe
Video games set in London
Konami arcade games
Video games developed in Japan